The 45th Annual Martín Fierro Awards, presented by the Asociación de Periodistas de la Televisión y Radiofonía Argentina (APTRA), was held on June 14, 2015. During the ceremony, APTRA announced the Martín Fierro Awards for 2014 Argentine television and radio programs.

Nominations
Carlos Sciacaluga of APTRA announced the nominations at El diario de Mariana, a TV program hosted by Mariana Fabbiani, who would host the awards ceremony. The controversial nomination for the best journalist program pitted 6, 7, 8 against Periodismo para todos (PPT) once more. The first program is a vocal supporter of the president Cristina Fernández de Kirchner, and the second is a vocal critic of her; Jorge Lanata from PPT was awarded in previous years and made political speeches when he received the award. Intratables, which had been nominated under other genres in previous years, was the third program in the nomination. 

The telenovela Guapas received the highest number of nominations, 11. It was followed by the telenovelas Viudas e hijos del Rock & Roll, with 7 nominations, and Sres. Papis, with 6. Underground producciones, producers of Viudas..., were surprised that Verónica Llinás and Luis Machín did not receive a nomination, and boycotted the ceremony.

The event
The awards ceremony was held on June 14, 2015, at the Hilton Buenos Aires. Mariana Fabbiani and Guido Kaczka were the hosts of the ceremony, and both of them received their own awards during the event: Fabbiani was awarded as best female TV host, and Kaczka was the host of Los 8 escalones, best entertainment program.

Rosario Lufrano made a speech in support of the #NiUnaMenos demonstration against femicides which had taken place a short time before. Singer Fabiana Cantilo attended the ceremony for the first time, being the singer of the opening theme for Guapas, and won the first of the several awards received by the telenovela. Jorge Lanata did not attend the ceremony, and his awards were received by fellow journalist Nicolás Wiñazki. 12 casas and Carla Peterson were among the unexpected winners, and Juan Minujín received the sole award given to Viudas....

Guapas received the Golden Martín Fierro Award, which was presented by Griselda Siciliani and Julieta Zylberberg (actresses from Farsantes, the previous year's winner). The producer Adrián Suar downplayed the protest of Underground, and pointed that several actors from Guapas deserved  a nomination as well but did not receive one.

Awards

Television
Winners are listed first and highlighted in boldface. Other nominations are listed in alphabetic order.

Radio
Winners are listed first and highlighted in boldface. Other nominations are listed in alphabetic order.

Honorary awards
 Honorific Martín Fierro award: Fundación Huésped, a NGO that works with HIV cases.
 Hilda Bernard, for her 73 years of working career.

References

2014 in Argentine television
2015 in Argentina
2015 television awards
Argentina culture-related lists